Steve Kramer is an American actor who has provided voices for English language versions of Japanese anime films, television series and video games. He has also done voice acting for various Power Rangers series in the past, with the best-known of those roles being the voice of Darkonda in Power Rangers in Space. His wife, Melora Harte, is a voice actress. Kramer has also been credited as Steve Kraemer, Steven Kramer, Drew Levi Thomas, Drew Lexi Thomas, and Drew Thomas. Kramer is usually cast in the role of wise old men. He is also a voice director and script writer, adapting many anime and video games.

Notable roles

Anime

 3x3 Eyes – Frog Demon, Mama
 The Adventures of Manxmouse – Mr. Pettin/Ethan/Truck Driver/Radio Announcer
 Accel World – Match Maker
 Aesop's Fables – The Grasshopper
 Ah! My Goddess: The Movie – Various
 Akira – Roy (Streamline dub), additional voices (Animaze dub)
 Apocalypse Zero – Zenigata
 Appleseed – Commander Lance
 Arc the Lad – Chimera, Operative, Soldier
 Argento Soma – FUNERAL Board
 Around the World with Willy Fog – Constable Bully
 Ayakashi Ayashi: Ayashi Divine Comedy – Yozo Torii
 Babel II – Babel
 Babel II: Beyond Infinity – Murai, Old Monk, UN Soldier
 Bakuto Sengen Daigunder – Despector
 Berserk: The Golden Age Arc – Lord Gennon
 The Big O – Bonnie Frazier
 Bleach – Shunsui Kyōraku, Barragan Luisenbarn
 Bleach: Fade to Black – Shunsui Kyoraku
 Bleach: Hell Verse – Murakumo
 Bobobo-bo Bo-bobo – Gechappi, Gasser's Neckbelt, Lead Battleship Special Forces Member, Lapalapa, General Lee Fishcake
 Blue Dragon – Talta Village Elder
 Button Nose – Benny, Bernie
 Carried by the Wind: Tsukikage Ran – Benitsubaki Clansman, Official, Restaurant Owner, Scam Victim
 Code Geass: Lelouch of the Rebellion – Priest (Ep. 13)
 Coppelion – Kunikida
 Cowboy Bebop – Carlos, Huey, Otto, Whitney Matsumoto
 Cowboy Bebop: The Movie – Carlos
 Crimson Wolf – Shinoda, Genghis Khan, Assassin
 Cyborg 009 – Cyborg 006 (Chang Changku)
 Daigunder – Despector
 Detatoko Princess – Fitness Brother, Mayor
 Digimon Adventure – Vilemon
 Digimon Adventure 02 – Starmon
 Digimon Data Squad – Rocky, Vilemon
 Digimon Tamers – Baihumon
 Digimon Frontier – Cerberumon, Starmon 1, Meteormon 1
 Digimon Fusion – Shurimon (Ep. 23–24), Wisemon (Season 2)
 Dirty Pair: Project Eden – Wattsman (Streamline dub)
 Dogtanian and the Three Muskehounds – Pip
 Doomed Megalopolis – Kuroda
 Early Reins – Col. Spencer
 Eureka 7 – Axel Thurston
 éX-Driver – Businessman, Dad, Driver
 Fake – Berkeley Rose, Ted
 Fighting Spirit – Mr. Yasuda
 Figure 17 – Isamu Kuroda
 FLCL – Nanadaba Shigekuni, Train Announcer, Martians Baseball Player
 Fushigi Yūgi – Mayo's Father (Eikoden), Seiryu Seiken
 Freedom – Chimpster
 Gad Guard – Attorney, Bartender, Gang Member 1, Man in Casino 1, Morro, Officer 1, Shopkeeper, Stallkeeper
 Gate Keepers – Rescue Worker
 Geneshaft – Chata, Ewers
 Ghost in the Shell: Stand Alone Complex – Churnow,
 Ghost in the Shell: Stand Alone Complex 2nd Gig – Chairman Tsutomo Tadokoro
 Ghost Slayers Ayashi – Yozo Torii, Ryudo's Employee, Vassal
 Great Pretender - Shougo Nakanoshima
 Grimm's Fairy Tale Classics – Wolf (Little Red Riding Hood)
 Gungrave – Randy
 .hack//Legend of the Twilight – Hot Spring Granny
 Heat Guy J – Mauro (2nd Voice "after the death of Anthony Mozdy")
 Idol Project – Ivie
 Immortal Grand Prix (microseries) – Dimmer
 JoJo's Bizarre Adventure – Dario Brando
 JoJo's Bizarre Adventure: Diamond is Unbreakable – Yoshihiro Kira
 Jungle de Ikou! – Ahem
 Kaze no Yojimbo – Detective Saeki
 Kiki's Delivery Service – Cop, Street Sweeper, additional voices (Streamline dub)
 Kurokami: The Animation – Bernhardt
 Kyo Kara Maoh! – Alford's Father, Bob, Heathcrife, Pirate, Shas, T-Zou
 Last Exile – Claimh-Solais Crewman, Fuel Attendant #1, Vanship Union Operator #1
 Leave it to Piyoko! – BGG Gang Member B, Horse, Robot
 Lensman – Worsel
 Lily C.A.T. – Dular
 A Little Snow Fairy Sugar – Henry, Lancelot the Turtle, Luchino
 Lu over the Wall - Grandfather
 Lupin III: The Castle of Cagliostro – Goemon Ishikawa XIII (Streamline release)
 Lupin III Part 1 - Lupin the Second
 Magi: The Kingdom of Magic – Matal Mogamett
 Mahoromatic: Something More Beautiful – Chocolate Chef, Delivery Man, Green Grocer, Management Leader/Oda Nobunaga, Street Thug 2
 Maple Town – Wilde Wolf
 MÄR: Märchen Awakens Romance – Gaira
 March Comes In like a Lion - Shoichi Matsunaga
 Mars Daybreak – EF Helmsman
 The Melancholy of Haruhi Suzumiya – Shamisen
 Mirage of Blaze – Nue, Teacher, Shingen Takeda
 Mobile Suit Gundam F91 – Bobulz, Gillet Krueger
 Mobile Suit Gundam: The 08th MS Team – Terry Sanders Jr.
 Mobile Suit Gundam: The Movie Trilogy – Tem Ray, Twaning
 Monster – Dr. Heinemann
 Mushrambo – Katris
 My Neighbor Totoro – Old Farmer, Kanta's Father (Streamline dub)
 Moribito: Guardian of the Spirit – Master Star Reader, Taga
 The Secret of Blue Water – Hanson (Streamline dub)
 Naruto – Third Hokage, Fish Seller
 Naruto Shippuden – Third Hokage
 Neo Tokyo – Driver
 New Getter Robo – Tsuna Watanabe
 New Gigantor – Inspector Ohtsuka
 Nightwalker – Director
 Ninja Cadets – Yukinobu
 Nodame Cantabile – Hidemi Saku, Sebastiano Viera, Takehiko Miyoshi, Tatsumi Mine
 Noein – Takuya Mayuzumi, Isuka, The Time Drifter
 Noozles – Osgood
 Nura: Rise of the Yokai Clan – Hebidayu, Professor Adashibara
 Otogi Zoshi – Regent, Tetsu
 Outlaw Star – Hadul
 Overman King Gainer – Pelhar
 Patlabor WXIII – Boat Captain, Detective, Engineer, Labor Technician, Police Officer, Security Guard, Yoshitake Misaki
 Phoenix – Kadan, Officer, Tsume Otoko (Sun Chapter)
 Pokémon: Hisuian Snow – Alec's father
 Robotech – Angelo Dante
 Rurouni Kenshin – Dr. Gensai, Police Officer (Ep. 33), Jirokichi Ebisu, Shakku Arai (Ep. 40), Shibumi
 Sailor Moon – Wiseman (Viz Media dub)
 Sailor Moon Crystal – Wiseman
 Saint Tail – Little
 Saiyuki Gunlock – Demon, Jiroshin, Priest, Servant
 Saiyuki Reload – Demon, Jiroshin, Servant, Tech
 Sakura Wars: The Movie – Musei Edogawa
 Samurai Champloo – Kariya Kagetoki
 Scrapped Princess – Old Man
 S-CRY-ed – Ayu Dairen
 Shinzo – Katris, Hyper Chiro, Panda
 Sol Bianca: The Legacy – Manager
 Space Pirate Captain Harlock – Crewmember, Bar Patron, Prime Minister, additional voices
 Sword Gai: The Animation - Shogun
 Tenchi Muyo! GXP – King Balta
 Tenjho Tenge – Dougen Takayanagi
 Transformers: Robots in Disguise – Cerebros, R.E.V.
 Urda – Baltram
 Vampire Hunter D – Dr. Fehring
 When They Cry – Teppei Hojo, Tatsuyoshi Kasai
 Wicked City – Jin
 Wild Arms: Twilight Venom – Dr. Sabriskie
 Witch Hunter Robin – Syndicate Gunman #3, Thug
 Wolf's Rain – Moss
 X – Scientist
 Ys II: Castle in the Heavens – Feiya Rall

Non-anime roles

 The Animated Alias: Tribunal – Rudolph Gaborno
 Computer Warriors – Minus
 Fly Me to the Moon – Leonid
 Little Big Panda - Additional voices
 The Happy Cricket – General
 Iznogoud – Iznogoud and various
 Jin Jin and the Panda Patrol – Dr. Maniac
 Little Mouse on the Prairie – Grandpa, B.C.
 The Little Polar Bear – Seagull #1
 The Return of Dogtanian – Pip
 Walter Melon – Additional voices
 Wisdom of the Gnomes – Holler
 The Wuzzles – Additional voices
 Bling – Zang

Live action roles

 Adventures in Voice Acting – Himself
 Babe: Pig in the City – Additional voices
 Big Bad Beetleborgs – Mucant (voice)
 CSI: NY – Administrative Judge
 Dallas Dante's Cove – Kevin's Stepfather
 Desperate Housewives – Detective Hewitt
 Drake & Josh – Stan the Car Man
 End of Days – Businessman
 ER – Pediatric Surgeon
 Everybody Hates Chris – Superintendent
 Falcon Crest – FBI Agent 1
 Gilmore Girls – Sam
 The Golden Girls – Dr. Stephen Deutsch
 Grosse Pointe – Director
 Hallo Spencer – Poldi, Karl-Gustav
 The Handler – Man
 Hooperman House M.D. – Ken
 Huff – Allen Meeks
 Hunter – Duty Officer
 Jake and the Fatman – Doctor
 Just Can't Get Enough – Detective Martin
 Looking for Comedy in the Muslim World – Sam Loman
 Love Boat: The Next Wave – 1st Mate
 Love Thy Neighbour – 3rd Guest
 Malcolm in the Middle – Doctor
 Masked Rider – Cyclopter (voice)
 Mighty Morphin' Power Rangers – Gnarly Gnome, Slippery Shark, Saliguana, Robogoat, Hatchasaurus (2nd voice), Cyclopter (voices, uncredited)
 The Naked Truth – Duchovny's Lawyer
 The Oldest Rookie – Willard Haskell
 One on One – Janitor
 Onmyoji – Doson (voice)
 Pacific Blue – Agent Hardy
 Power Rangers Zeo – Wolfbane (voice, uncredited)
 Power Rangers Turbo – Dreadfeather (voice, uncredited)
 Power Rangers In Space – Darkonda, Darkliptor (voices)
 Power Rangers Time Force – Electropede (voice)
 Power Rangers Wild Force – Turbine Org (voice)
 Roseanne – Roger's Father
 Rusty: A Dog's Tale – Additional voices (voice)
 The Story Lady – Salesperson
 Ultraman: The Ultimate Hero – Dan
 VR Troopers – Drillbot, Terminoid, Transgressor (voices)
 The West Wing – Deputy Secretary
 The Young and the Restless Zeiram – Murata (voice)
 Zeiram 2 – Store Manager, Shop Keeper, Th (voices)
 10-8: Officers on Duty – Gary Thorsen
 24: Conspiracy – James Sutton

Foreign dubbing

Video game rolesAssassin's Creed – Additional voicesBaten Kaitos Origins – Dark BrotherBleach: Shattered Blade – Shunsui KyōrakuBleach: Soul Resurrección – Shunsui KyōrakuBlood and Magic – VoiceCitizens of Earth – Opposition LeaderDirge of Cerberus: Final Fantasy VII – Incidental CharactersFinal Fantasy XIII – Additional voicesGundam Side Story 0079: Rise From the Ashes – Visch Donahue, additional voicesLife Is Strange 2 – Additional VoicesLords of EverQuest – Additional voicesNaruto: Clash of Ninja Revolution – Third HokageNaruto: Rise of a Ninja – Third HokageNaruto to Boruto: Shinobi Striker - Third HokageNaruto Shippuden: Ultimate Ninja Impact – Third HokageNaruto Shippuden: Ultimate Ninja Storm 2 – Third HokageNaruto Shippuden: Ultimate Ninja Storm 3 – Third HokageNaruto Shippuden: Ultimate Ninja Storm 4 – Third HokageNaruto Shippuden: Ultimate Ninja Storm Generations – Third HokageNaruto Shippuden: Ultimate Ninja Storm Revolution – Third HokageNaruto: The Broken Bond – Third HokageParaworld – Hermit, KleemanPhase Paradox - Lance FullerRobotech: Battlecry – SkarrdeThe Elder Scrolls V: Skyrim – Additional voicesSpace Channel 5 – JaguarStar Trek: Judgment Rites – Azrah, James Munro, Klingon Aide

Miscellaneous crew

Script adaptation
 The Adventures of Tom Sawyer Bakuto Sengen Daigunder Battle B-Daman Black Jack Bleach Bleach: The Hell Verse Blue Dragon' The Cockpit Daigunder Digimon Adventure Dinozaurs The Dog of Flanders Future Boy Conan (The Lost Intersound, Inc. pilot dub 1980s)
 Gatchaman Geneshaft Gestalt Grimm's Fairy Tale Classics Honeybee Hutch Iron Man: Rise of Technovore K The Littl' Bits Maple Town Maya the Bee Metal Fighter Miku Mighty Morphin' Power Rangers Mon Colle Knights Monster Mushrambo Noozles Ox Tales The Return of Dogtanian Robotech Saban's Adventures of Peter Pan Saban's Adventures of Pinocchio Saban's Adventures of the Little Mermaid Sailor Moon S (Viz Media dub)
 Samurai Pizza Cats Sandokan SD Gundam Force Shinzo Tenchi in Tokyo Tiger & Bunny Transformers: Robots in Disguise Tokyo Pig Vampire Princess Miyu VR Troopers Wild 7 Wowser YS-II ZeiramCasting director
 Twilight of the CockroachesVoice director
 Bleach: Fade to Black Blue Dragon The Cockpit Captain Harlock and the Queen of a Thousand Years Codename: Robotech Dinozaurs DNA Sights 999.9 Eagle Riders Gatchaman Honeybee Hutch Kyo Kara Maoh! Radiata Stories Requiem from the Darkness Robotech Robotech: Invasion Saint Tail – Director
 Shinzo Speed Racer X The Wicked and the Damned: A Hundred Tales of Karma Tokyo Pig Transformers: Robots in DisguiseADR loop group
 Codename: Robotech Coronado Fly Me to the Moon A Turtle's Tale 2: Sammy's Escape from Paradise Nice Guys Sleep Alone The Prince of Egypt Resurrecting the Champ When Time Expires''

References

External links
 
 

American male screenwriters
American male television actors
American male television writers
American male voice actors
American television writers
American casting directors
American voice directors
Living people
Male actors from Orange County, California
Robotech cast and crew
University of California, Los Angeles alumni
Screenwriters from California
Year of birth missing (living people)